The 2014 IIHF U20 Challenge Cup of Asia was an international men's under-20 ice hockey tournament run by the International Ice Hockey Federation. The tournament took place between 4 August and 7 August 2014 in Yuzhno-Sakhalinsk, Russia and was the third edition held since its formation in 2012 under the IIHF Challenge Cup of Asia series of tournaments. The MHL Red Stars won the tournament after winning all three of their round-robin games and finishing first in the standings. The win was the MHL Red Stars second title having previously won in 2012. Kazakhstan finished in second place and Japan finished third.

Overview
The 2014 IIHF U20 Challenge Cup of Asia began on 4 August 2014 in Yuzhno-Sakhalinsk, Russia with games played at Arena City. Japan, South Korea and Russia's MHL Red Stars all returned after competing in last years tournament, while Kazakhstan made their debut in the IIHF U20 Challenge Cup of Asia. The Red Stars team was made up of players from the MHL's Sakhalinskie Akuly club which is based Yuzhno-Sakhalinsk. Japan entered the tournament as the defending champion after claiming their first title in 2013.

The tournament consisted of a single round-robin with each team competing in three games. The MHL Red Stars won the tournament after winning all three of their games and finished first in the standings. The win gave the MHL Red Stars their second tournament title after previously winning in 2012. Kazakhstan finished second after losing only to the Red Stars and Japan finished third after managing only one win against South Korea. MHL Red Stars' Oleg Genze led the tournament in scoring with ten points and Nikita Ivandikov finished as the tournaments leading goaltender with a save percentage of 92.31.

Standings

Fixtures
All times are local. (MAGT – UTC+11)

Scoring leaders
List shows the top ten skaters sorted by points, then goals, assists, and the lower penalties in minutes.

Leading goaltenders
Only the top goaltenders, based on save percentage, who have played at least 40% of their team's minutes are included in this list.

References

External links
Tournament page at IIHF.com

IIHF U20 Challenge Cup of Asia
2013–14 in Russian ice hockey
IIHF U20 Challenge Cup of Asia
IIHF Challenge Cups of Asia
International ice hockey competitions hosted by Russia
Asian ice hockey competitions for junior teams